The Institut national supérieur des arts du spectacle et des techniques de diffusion, better known as INSAS, is a Belgian film and drama school founded by Raymond Ravar, André Delvaux, Paul Anrieu, and Jean Brismée in 1962.

Director Fabrice Du Welz, was a former student.

References

External links 
Official Website

Educational institutions established in 1962
Film schools in Belgium
Art schools in Belgium
Graphic design schools
1962 establishments in Belgium